Edward Crawford Balch (July 17, 1858 – February 8, 1934) was a builder and businessman.  He built 175 houses in Maplewood, New Jersey and became known as the Father of Maplewood.  He also owned a women's clothing business; Orange Screen Company, a manufacturing business; and John O'Rourke, a lumber and coal business.  He married Kate McKinney on March 20, 1879. They had three sons (Edward Jr., Harry, Everett) and two daughters (Ida, Florence).

The Maplewood Country Club was formed at a meeting, held inside his home on Ridgewood Road in 1903.

References

Sources 

 

1858 births
1934 deaths
Businesspeople from New Jersey
People from Maplewood, New Jersey